Lubbockichthys multisquamatus, the fine-scaled dottyback, is a species of fish in the family Pseudochromidae.

Description

Distribution and habitat
Lubbockichthys multisquamatus is found throughout the eastern Indian Ocean and into the central Pacific.

References

Pseudoplesiopinae
Taxa named by Gerald R. Allen
Fish described in 1987